Keilor Botanic Gardens, located in Melbourne's north-west in the suburb of Keilor Park, is entirely devoted to Australian native flora. Created in 1982, it covers 10 hectares. It is managed by the City of Brimbank as part of Keilor Park Reserve and Botanic Gardens.

References

Botanical gardens in Victoria (Australia)
Parks in Melbourne
Tourist attractions in Melbourne
1982 establishments in Australia
City of Brimbank